Abstract Wikipedia is an in-development project of the Wikimedia Foundation that aims to use Wikifunctions to create a language-independent version of Wikipedia using its structured data.

The overall project was conceived by Denny Vrandečić, the co-founder of Wikidata, in a Google working paper in April 2020, formally proposed in May 2020 (as Wikilambda), and approved by the Wikimedia Foundation board of trustees in July 2020 as Abstract Wikipedia. In March 2021, Vrandečić published an overview of the system in the article "Building a Multilingual Wikipedia" in the computer science journal Communications of the ACM.

References

External links 
 

Wikipedia
Wikimedia projects